PT Express Transindo Utama Tbk (doing business under the name Express Group) is a Indonesian ground transportation company headquartered in Jakarta. Until the end of 2021, this company operates 130 taxi units and 40 bus units in Jadetabek (Greater Jakarta). Express Group is also the second largest taxi company in Indonesia after Blue Bird Group.

History 
The company started its history in 1981 as a trading and distribution company under the name "PT Kasih Bhakti Utama". In 1991, this company changed its name to what it is now and shifted its business to land transportation. In 2002, the company started implementing a partnership scheme, in which drivers can operate one unit of the company's vehicle for five to seven years. After that, the vehicle can belong to the driver. In 2010, the company started providing premium taxi services, and in 2012, the company officially listed on the Indonesia Stock Exchange. In 2021, the company is holding a second private placement.

Subsidiaries 
Until the end of 2021, this company has 16 subsidiaries, namely:
 PT Wahyu Mustika Kinasih, engages in the taxation sector in Tangerang City, Banten
 PT Semesta Indoprima, engages in the taxation sector in West Jakarta, Special Capital Region of Jakarta
 PT Tulus Sinar Selatan, engages in the taxation sector in South Jakarta, Special Capital Region of Jakarta
 PT Mutiara Express Perdana, engages in the taxation sector in Bekasi City, West Java
 PT Fajar Mutiara Timur, engages in the taxation sector in South Tangerang, Banten
 PT Express Kencana Lestari, engages in the taxation sector in Depok, West Java
 PT Ekspres Sarana Batu Ceper, engages in the taxation sector in Bekasi City, West Java
 PT Ekspres Mulia Kencana, engages in the taxation sector in Bekasi City, West Java
 PT Indo Semesta Luhur, engages in the taxation sector in Surabaya, East Java
 PT Express Kartika Perdana, engages in the taxation sector in Surabaya, East Java
 PT Express Limo Nusantara, engages in the taxation sector in Medan, North Sumatra
 PT Satria Express Perdana, engages in the taxation sector in Semarang, Central Java
 PT Express Sabana Utama, engages in the taxation sector in Padang, West Sumatra
 PT Lendang Karun, engages in the taxation sector in Mataram, West Nusa Tenggara
 PT Express Jakarta Jaya, engages in Jakarta
 PT Mutiara Kencana Sejahtera, engages in Jakarta

Images

See also 
 Blue Bird Group

References 

Taxi companies
Indonesian companies established in 1981
Transport companies established in 1981
1981 establishments in Indonesia
Transport companies of Indonesia
Companies based in Jakarta
Companies listed on the Indonesia Stock Exchange